B2B, B to B, or B-to-B may refer to:

Sports
 B2B, a controversial and short lived class in the 1979 Sidecar World Championship
 Bay to Breakers, an annual footrace in San Francisco, California on the third Sunday of May
 Budapest-Bamako, now the largest amateur rally in the world, the largest rally across the Sahara and an important charity car race in Africa
 Box-to-box, central midfielders who are skilled at both defending and attacking

Other uses
 BtoB (band), a South Korean boy group
 Business-to-business, commerce transactions between businesses, such as between a manufacturer and a wholesaler, or between a wholesaler and a retailer

See also
B2C
B2G
 Back to Back (disambiguation)
 Back to Basics (disambiguation)
 BOTB (disambiguation)